Ekmekçi can refer to:

 Ekmekçi, Edirne
 Ekmekçi, Karacabey
 Ekmekçi, Sungurlu